Clatterford End is a hamlet on the B184 road, just south of the village of Fyfield, in the Epping Forest District, in the English county of Essex. Its post town is ONGAR.

Hamlets in Essex
Epping Forest District